Durgaulia is a village in West Champaran district in the Indian state of Bihar.

Demographics
As of 2011 India census, Durgaulia had a population of 1983 in 316 households. Males constitute 52.54% of the population and females 47.45%. Durgaulia has an average literacy rate of 41.65%, lower than the national average of 74%: male literacy is 67.19%, and female literacy is 32.8%. In Durgaulia, 22.44% of the population is under 6 years of age.

References

Villages in West Champaran district